The Women's football tournament at the 2019 Military World Games was held in Wuhan in China from 17 to 26 October.

Group stage

Group A

Group B

Knockout stage

Semi-finals

Bronze medal match

Gold medal match

External links
Football tournament of the 7th Military World Games  - Official website of the 2019 Military World Games

Football Women
Military World Games
2019 women
2019 women